Lewey Lake is a lake located southwest of Indian Lake. Fish species present in the lake are lake trout, lake whitefish, northern pike, smallmouth bass, yellow perch, rock bass, white sucker, and black bullhead. There is a boat launch with a fee in Lewey Lake Campground, on the northeast shore off NY-30.

References

Lakes of New York (state)
Lakes of Hamilton County, New York